The Caouette stream (in French: ruisseau Caouette) flows in the municipalities of Saint-Théophile (MRC Beauce-Sartigan Regional County Municipality) and Saint-Robert-Bellarmin (MRC Le Granit Regional County Municipality), in the administrative region of Chaudière-Appalaches, in Quebec, in Canada.

Toponymy 
The toponym "Ruisseau Caouette" was made official on December 5, 1968, at the Commission de toponymie du Québec.

See also 

 List of rivers of Quebec

References 

Rivers of Estrie
Rivers of Chaudière-Appalaches
Beauce-Sartigan Regional County Municipality
Le Granit Regional County Municipality